Who is Undercover is a 2014 Chinese suspense drama film directed by Fan Jianhui. It was released on December 31.

Cast
Lin Chi-ling
Tony Leung Ka-fai
Gillian Chung
Meng Tingyi
Vivian Wu
Christopher Lee
Kent Cheng
Kaiser Chuang
Su Jin
Liu Lujia
Lu Yulai

Reception
By January 7, 2015, the film had earned ¥30.72 million at the Chinese box office.

References

Chinese suspense films
2014 drama films